List of military equipment used by Syrian Democratic Forces in the Syrian Civil War. This list does not include equipment used by the Islamic State of Iraq and the Levant and the Syrian opposition.

Sources
The YPG and overall SDF have largely acquired their weaponry from local sources. With small arms being seized from Syrian Army weapons depots or as the result of clashes with other factions. During the war against Islamist groups and the Islamic State, the SDF captured weapons and vehicles which came from other countries, primarily Iraq. Weapons transfers have also taken place between the Syrian Government and the YPG on a small scale, such as at Tel Rifaat. The YPG has received weapons and equipment from the United States in the form of small arms, ammunition, armored vehicles, and medical support, with a large boost delivered for the Raqqa offensive.

Equipment

Small arms

Anti-tank

Mortars

Armored vehicles

Utility vehicles
All are pickup trucks which were either modified to hold weapons, or are used to transport troops to battlefields.

See also 
 List of military equipment of Islamic State
 List of military equipment used by Syrian opposition forces

References

Military equipment of Syria
Military equipment
Syria
Syrian Democratic Forces